Victoria Rodionovna Kan (born 3 August 1995) is a Russian tennis player.

She has won 23 singles and 14 doubles titles on the ITF Women's Circuit. On 31 March 2014, she reached her best singles ranking of world No. 151. On 27 July 2015, she peaked at No. 359 in the WTA doubles rankings.

In November 2013, Kan won the inaugural Soho Square Ladies Tournament in Sharm El Sheikh, a $75,000+H event, by defeating Nastja Kolar in straight sets in the final.

Playing for Russia Fed Cup team, she made her debut in February 2014, losing to Australia's Samantha Stosur in straight sets in their World Group first-round tie.

Grand Slam singles performance timelines

Junior Grand Slam finals

Girls' doubles: 1 (runner–up)

ITF Circuit finals

Singles: 31 (23 titles, 8 runner–ups)

Doubles: 22 (14 titles, 8 runner–ups)

Fed Cup participation

Singles

References

External links

 
 
 

1995 births
Living people
Sportspeople from Tashkent
Russian female tennis players
Russian people of Uzbek descent
Russian people of Korean descent
Universiade medalists in tennis
Universiade bronze medalists for Russia
Medalists at the 2019 Summer Universiade
20th-century Russian women
21st-century Russian women